This is a list of shipwrecks located in or around North America, within the territorial waters of countries which for political purposes are considered a part of the North American continent, including Canada, the United States, Mexico, Central America, and the island nations of the Caribbean.

Bermuda

Canada

Caribbean

Bahamas

British Virgin Islands

Cuba

Dominican Republic

Grenada

Haiti

Lesser Antilles

Saint Vincent

Trinidad and Tobago

Turks and Caicos Islands

Guatemala

Mexico

Panama

United States

Notes

References

Further reading

External links
WRECKSITE Worldwide database of + 65,000 wrecks with history, maritime charts and GPS positions (subscription required)
Ship Information Database Contains historical data about ships that were registered with Canadian ports or that sailed Canadian waters.

North America
Shipwrecks